Sodium stearate (IUPAC: Sodium Octadecanoate) is the sodium salt of stearic acid. This white solid is the most common soap.  It is found in many types of solid deodorants, rubbers, latex paints, and inks. It is also a component of some food additives and food flavorings.

Use
Characteristic of soaps, sodium stearate has both hydrophilic and hydrophobic parts, the carboxylate and the long hydrocarbon chain, respectively.  These two chemically different components induce the formation of micelles, which present the hydrophilic heads outwards and their hydrophobic (hydrocarbon) tails inwards, providing a lipophilic environment for hydrophobic compounds. The tail part dissolves the grease (or) dirt and forms the micelle. It is also used in the pharmaceutical industry as a surfactant to aid the solubility of hydrophobic compounds in the production of various mouth foams.

Production
Sodium stearate is produced as a major component of soap upon saponification of oils and fats.  The percentage of the sodium stearate depends on the ingredient fats.  Tallow is especially high in stearic acid content (as the triglyceride), whereas most fats only contain a few percent.  The idealized equation for the formation of sodium stearate from stearin (the triglyceride of stearic acid) follows:

(C18H35O2)3C3H5  +  3 NaOH   →   C3H5(OH)3  +  3 C18H35O2Na

Purified sodium stearate can be made by neutralizing stearic acid with sodium hydroxide.

References

External links
 Safety Data

Organic sodium salts
Stearates
Soaps
Anionic surfactants